Shivaji Bhanudas Kardile is a two times Member of Legislative Assembly of Maharashtra. He was elected in 2014 and in 2019 after receiving a ticket from the Bhartiya Janta Party. He has been elected from the Rahuri constituency and owned a dairy business before he joined politics. In 2018, Kardile was arrested by Ahmednagar police in connection to the killings of Shivsena leader Sanjay Kotkar and Vasant Thube.

Early life 
Kardile studied secondary school and left education after that.

See also 

 Marathi Wikipedia

References 

Living people
Maharashtra politicians
Year of birth missing (living people)
Bharatiya Janata Party politicians from Maharashtra